Paranotoreas brephosata  is a species of moth in the family Geometridae. This species is endemic to New Zealand.

Taxonomy
This species was first described by Francis Walker in 1862 and given the name Fidonia brephosata.

George Hudson discussed and illustrated this species in his 1898 book New Zealand Moths and Butterflies (Macro-lepidoptera) and his 1928 book The Butterflies and Moths of New Zealand under the name Notoreas brephos. In 1986 Robin C. Craw proposed placing this species within the genus Paranotoreas. The lectotype specimen is held at the Natural History Museum, London.

Description
Hudson described the species as follows:

References

Larentiinae
Moths of New Zealand
Endemic fauna of New Zealand
Endangered biota of New Zealand
Moths described in 1865
Taxa named by Francis Walker (entomologist)
Endemic moths of New Zealand